The 1872 Stevens football team represented Stevens Institute of Technology in the 1872 college football season.

Schedule

References

Stevens
Stevens Tech Ducks football seasons
College football winless seasons
Stevens football